Petr A. Druzhinin; Russian–Israeli historian and author, an expert in rare books and manuscripts; PhD in history. Research fellow of the Tel Aviv University and Institute of Linguistics of the Russian Academy of Sciences

Early life and education

Born in Moscow, Russia into a family of historians on 29 March 1974.

1991: Graduated from a secondary school in Moscow. 1996: Stroganov Moscow State Academy of Arts and Industry: a degree in history of arts; defended a thesis on The History of Russian Engraving in the 18th Century. 2002: Graduate school at Moscow Technological University (MIREA) (Department of Condensed Matter Physics: History of Physics). Earned a PhD in history in 2009 from Russian State University for the Humanities, Moscow (following a successful defense of a thesis on Heraldry and Antique Bookbinding).

Academic work

Authored more than 15 books, as well as many articles on the history of humanities and auxiliary sciences of history, history of science, history of antisemitism, rare books studies, etc., published in scientific journals, such as «Russian Literature», «Physics–Uspekhy (Advances in Physical Sciences)», "Historical Studies in the Natural Sciences", «New Literary Review», etс.; in the Russian Academy of Sciences’ Yearbooks «Monuments of Culture: New discoveries».

Books

«Bookbinding and Superexlibris as Monuments of Decorative Art», 1994

«Boris Kremer's Polar Library: A Catalogue (Russian Geographic Society)», 1999

«Russian Heraldic Book-Stamps», 2000

«The Palace of the Soviets: Alexey Shchusev's Design », 2001

«Unknown Letters of Russian Writers to Prince Alexander Kurakin (1752–1818)», 2002

«Frederick the Great's Books», 2004

«A Catalogue of Russian Engraved Portraits from Gregory Gennady's Collection», 2004

«A Catalogue of Inscribed Books from Prof. Georgy Makogonenko's Library» (co-authored with A. Sobolev), 2006

«Lists of the Knights of Russian Imperial Orders from 1699 to 1796 by Nicolai Bantysh-Kamensky, 1813», a new revised edition, 2006

«A General Armorial of Noble Families of the Russian Empire, Vols. 1–10, 1799–1840», a new revised edition, 2009

«Ideology and Philology: Leningrad, 1940s. A Documentary Study», Vol. 1–2, 2014.

«Heraldry and Rare Books: Selected works», Vol. 1–2, 2014.

«Ideology and Philology, Vol 3: The Konstantin Azadovskii Affair. A Documentary Study», 2016. 

«Lists of the Knights of Russian Imperial Orders from 1699 to 1796 by Nicolai Bantysh-Kamensky, 1813», a new revised and greatly enlarged edition, 2018.

«Mendeleev’s Periodic Table enigma», 2019.

«Pyotr Druzhinin's and Alexander Sobolev's Rare Book Collection: A Catalogue», Vol. 1–3, 2021.

«The Soviet Suppression of Academia: The Case of Konstantin Azadovsky» (Bloomsbury Academic), 2022  Transl. by Sarah Vitali

Research Awards

2014: was awarded the Efim Etkind Prize «For outstanding contribution to scientific, cultural and literary relations between Russia and the West» for his book «Ideology and Philology», vol. 1–2;

2016: received the Udo Ivask Medal and Certificate of Honour from the International Federation of Ex-Libris Societies «For outstanding contribution to the study of bookplates» for a series of monographs in Book's History Studies.

Miscellaneous

Since 1990, Dr Petr A. Druzhinin has held various positions within departments of antique books, manuscripts and engravings with Moscow antiques auction houses: starting as an intern, and gradually advancing to a junior expert, an expert, a senior expert, and a chief expert (2006). He is widely regarded one of Russia's leading experts in the field of rare books and manuscripts; a collector of rare books and antique prints.

Full member of the Russian Geographical Society since 1999.

2013: A Visiting Research Fellow at the University of Sheffield, UK; his research project title was: «Codex Sinaiticus’ Voyage from the Soviet Russia to the United Kingdom».

References

External links
Bloomsbury Authors
Discussion of the Dr Druzhinin' monograph "Ideology and Philology" in London
Biography on the newspaper.ru website
The personal page – Society of auxiliary sciences of history website

21st-century Russian historians
Russian philologists
1974 births
Israeli historians
Russian emigrants to Israel
21st-century Russian male writers
20th-century Israeli male writers
21st-century Israeli male writers
Living people
Stroganov Moscow State Academy of Arts and Industry alumni